Negro National League can refer to either one or both of the two leagues of Negro league baseball in the USA in the first half of the twentieth century:

 Negro National League (1920–1931)
 Negro National League (1933–1948)